Marrubium peregrinum (horehound) is a species of herbaceous perennial plant, with height up to 60 cm, native to south-east Europe, the Balkans, and Asia Minor.

Synonyms 
 Atirbesia bracteata Raf.
 Marrubium affine Host
 Marrubium angustifolium Moench
 Marrubium candidissimum L.
 Marrubium candidissimum Orsini ex Ten.
 Marrubium civice Klokov
 Marrubium creticum Mill.
 Marrubium creticum Roth
 Marrubium flexuosum Moench
 Marrubium odoratissimum Pourr. ex Steud.
 Marrubium pannonicum Rchb.
 Marrubium pauciflorum Wallr.
 Marrubium peregrinum var. creticum (Mill.) Nyman
 Marrubium pestalozzae auct.
 Marrubium praecox Janka
 Marrubium remotum Janka
 Marrubium rubrum Roth
 Marrubium setaceum Desr.
 Marrubium uncinatum Hornem.

References 
 Carl Linnaeus, Species Plantarum 2, 1753, p. 582.
 The Plant List entry
 
 Encyclopedia of Life entry

peregrinum
Plants described in 1753
Taxa named by Carl Linnaeus